Vesyolaya Roshcha is a rural locality (a village) in Malinovsky Selsoviet, Belebeyevsky District, Bashkortostan, Russia. The population was 73 as of 2010. There are 3 streets.

Geography 
Vesyolaya Roshcha is located 8 km southwest of Belebey (the district's administrative centre) by road. Svoboda is the nearest rural locality.

References 

Rural localities in Belebeyevsky District